Calderdale Metropolitan Borough Council is the local authority for Calderdale in West Yorkshire, England. One third of the council is elected each year, except for every fourth year when there is no election.

Political control
The first election to the council was held in 1973, initially operating as a shadow authority before coming into its powers on 1 April 1974. County-level services were provided by West Yorkshire County Council until its abolition in 1986, when Calderdale became a unitary authority. Political control of the council since 1973 has been held by the following parties:

Leadership
The leaders of the council since 1999 have been:

Council elections
1973 Calderdale Metropolitan Borough Council election
1975 Calderdale Metropolitan Borough Council election
1976 Calderdale Metropolitan Borough Council election
1978 Calderdale Metropolitan Borough Council election
1979 Calderdale Metropolitan Borough Council election
1980 Calderdale Metropolitan Borough Council election
1982 Calderdale Metropolitan Borough Council election
1983 Calderdale Metropolitan Borough Council election
1984 Calderdale Metropolitan Borough Council election
1986 Calderdale Metropolitan Borough Council election
1987 Calderdale Metropolitan Borough Council election
1988 Calderdale Metropolitan Borough Council election
1990 Calderdale Metropolitan Borough Council election
1991 Calderdale Metropolitan Borough Council election
1992 Calderdale Metropolitan Borough Council election
1994 Calderdale Metropolitan Borough Council election
1995 Calderdale Metropolitan Borough Council election
1996 Calderdale Metropolitan Borough Council election
1998 Calderdale Metropolitan Borough Council election
1999 Calderdale Metropolitan Borough Council election
2000 Calderdale Metropolitan Borough Council election
2002 Calderdale Metropolitan Borough Council election
2003 Calderdale Metropolitan Borough Council election
2004 Calderdale Metropolitan Borough Council election
2006 Calderdale Metropolitan Borough Council election
2007 Calderdale Metropolitan Borough Council election
2008 Calderdale Metropolitan Borough Council election
2010 Calderdale Metropolitan Borough Council election
2011 Calderdale Metropolitan Borough Council election
2012 Calderdale Metropolitan Borough Council election
2014 Calderdale Metropolitan Borough Council election
2015 Calderdale Metropolitan Borough Council election
2016 Calderdale Metropolitan Borough Council election
2018 Calderdale Metropolitan Borough Council election
2019 Calderdale Metropolitan Borough Council election
2021 Calderdale Metropolitan Borough Council election
2022 Calderdale Metropolitan Borough Council election

Borough result maps

By-election results

The January 2003 Mixenden by-election has become synonymous as an example of a likely Condorcet loser winning.

References

External links
Calderdale Metropolitan Borough Council

 
Council elections in West Yorkshire
Elections in Calderdale
Calderdale
Local government in Calderdale